The Al Khater family is a prestigious family in the Middle East. They belong to Al Buainain of Banu Tamim. The family expands in several Middle Eastern countries including Qatar, Saudi Arabia and Bahrain. The Al Khater are the ones who built two major cities in the Middle East which are Jubail in Saudi Arabia and the former capital of Qatar, Al Wakrah.

The Al Khater has close family and political ties with Al Saud, the rulers of Saudi Arabia; Al Khalifa, the rulers of Bahrain; and, most closely, Al Thani, the rulers of Qatar.

Al Khater and Al Saud
The relation between the two families started when Mohammed bin Hassan Al Khater found Abdul Rahman ibn Faisal; the last ruler of the Second Saudi State seeking refuge in his mosque in Bahrain when he got defeated by Al Rashid and forced into exile, where he offered him and those with him (including his son the later King Abdul Aziz) his house to sleep in, Mohammed bin Hassan then helped Abdul Rahman reach Isa ibn Ali Al-Khalifa.
In Saudi Arabia, in the unification war when Abdul-Aziz bin Saud was trying to unify the Kingdom of Saudi Arabia, Al Khater (Sheikh Mohammed bin Ali Al Khater ruler of Jubail) joined forces with Abdul-Aziz bin Saud (e.g. battle of  Kinzan, 1915) and they helped in the unification war in the region that Al Khater controlled and in the nearby territories.  After the unification war King Abdul-Aziz had a strong relationship with leaders of Al Khater where he used to visit them from time to time and he even wanted to marry one of the daughters of Sheikh Mohammed bin Ali Al Khater ruler of Jubail at that time but his daughters were married.

Al Khater and Al Khalifa
Sheikh Mohammed bin Hassan Al Khater had solid ties with the heads of Al Khalifa (ruling family of Bahrain), his relationship with them was based on respect and good manners, he himself used to own many farms in Bahrain including the one that is still there near Bahrain International Airport where everyone nowadays can see part of one of his old farms during landing and take off. Sheikh Mohammed bin Hassan helped in trading Sheikh Ibrahim bin Ali Al Khalifa for Sheikh Qassim bin Mohammed Al-Thani where Sheikh Ibrahim was captured in Qatar and Sheikh Qassim was captured in Bahrain.

Al Khater and Al Thani
Al Khater and Al Thani (the ruling family of Qatar) have close ties, Sheikh Qassim bin Mohammed bin Thani Al Thani (second ruler of Qatar) was prisoned in Bahrain, and members of Al Khater were the ones responsible for getting him  out of prison where they traded Sheikh Qassim for Sheikh Ibrahim bin Ali Al Khalifa who was captured in Qatar. Later on the family ties got stronger where Sheikh Mohammed bin Hassan Al Khater married Sheikha Sabika daughter of Sheikh Qassim. The ties got stronger and stronger as Sheikh Fahad bin Mohammed bin Hassan Married Sheikha Nora the only daughter of Sheikh Ali bin Qassim Al Thani (Jouan) and granddaughter of Sheikh Qassim, also Sheikha Mariam bint Khater Al Khater married Sheikh Abdulrahman bin Qassim the head of Al Abdulrahman of Al Thani. The family ties between Al Khater and Al Thani is one of the strongest ties in Qatar due to the marriages that occur between these two families.

Dispute over Al Khater
As Al Khater grew bigger and stronger, families and tribes of the Middle East had many relationships with the family, many of those relationships lead many families and tribes to try to get closer to Al Khater by either calling them their cousins or calling them a family of the same tribe. Banu Khalid for example; whom descends from Khalid ibn al-Walid and many other Arab tribes fought to get Al Khater to join them in order to honor their own tribe with the name of Al Khater, this led to a lot of misunderstanding about the family history line of Al Khater where many of those tribes have indeed called Al Khater one of its many families. Al Khater never agreed nor refused to join any other tribe and made it clear that they belong to Banu Tamim and was clear that whoever called Al Khater one of their families is just to honor that tribe and had nothing to do with the family but it was the choice and decision of that tribe such as Banu Khalid when they named Al Khater a family of their own.

Figures
 Sheikh Ali bin Rashed bin Mubarak Al Khater: ruler of Al Wakrah.
 Sheikh Abdulla bin Ali Al Khater: ruler of Al Wakrah and one of three founders of Jubail.
 Sheikh Mohammed bin Ali Al Khater: ruler and one of three founders of Jubail.
 Sheikh Mohammed bin Hassan Al Khater: head of Al Khater in Bahrain.
 Abdulrahman bin Khalid Al Khater: former president of the Amiri Diwan in Qatar.
 Mubarak bin Ali Al Khater: former Minister of Foreign Affairs in Qatar.
 Ali bin Mohammed Al Khater: former Minister of Municipality in Qatar.
 Rashed bin Mohammed Al Khater: Qatar's Ex-Ambassador to United Kingdom, Tunis and Libya.
 Fahad bin Fahad Al Khater: Qatar's Ex-Ambassador to Russia and Syria, and first Qatari Ambassador to Austria.
 Abdulla bin Mohammed Al Khater: Qatar's Ex-Ambassador to Yemen, Lebanon, and Oman.
 Khalid bin Fahad Al Khater :Qatar's Ex-Ambassador to Denmark and Netherlands.
 Rashed bin Ali Al Khater: Qatar's Ex-Ambassador to Singapore and Bulgaria.
 Mohammed bin Khater Al Khater: Qatar's Ex-Ambassador to Indonesia, and current Qatari Ambassador to India.
 Yousif bin Ali Al Khater: Qatar's Ex-Ambassador to Australia and United Kingdom, and current member of the Consultative Assembly of Qatar.
 Sultan bin Ali Al Khater: Qatar's current Ambassador to Bosnia and Herzegovina.
 Khalid bin Salman Al Khater: former president of Engineering Precinct in Qatar.
 Rashed bin Mohammed Al Khater: first Consultative Assembly of Qatar member of Al Khater.
 Khalid bin Mohammed Al Khater: former member and former vice president of the Consultative Assembly of Qatar.
 Yousif bin Rashid Al Khater: former member of the Consultative Assembly of Qatar.
 Khalid bin Nasser Al Khater, Ph.D: Dean of Academic Affairs at Ahmed bin Mohammed Military College and Vice President  for Administration and Financial Affairs at Qatar University.
 Al Hareth Mohammed bin Rashed Al Khater, M.D.: Clinical Assistant Professor at Qatar University.
 Hessah bint Mohammed Al Khater: Assistant Professor of Dawa and Ehtisab at Qatar University.
 Lolwah bint Rashed Al Khater: Current Assistant Foreign Minister and spokesperson for the Ministry of Foreign Affairs in Qatar.
 Salman bin Khalid Al Khater: champion of GT Academy Middle East Season 1, 2013.
 Mohammed bin Fahad Al Khater: Space Camp Ambassador U.S. Space & Rocket Center, Huntsville ALABAMA.
 Sultan bin Rashid Al Khater: Current Undersecretary of Ministry of Commerce and Industry.

References

Qatari families
Tribes of Arabia